George Carver may refer to:
George Carver (academic) (1888–1949), American professor
George Carver (cricketer) (1879–1912), English cricketer
George Washington Carver (c. 1864–1943), American botanist

See also
George C. Clerk, full name George Carver Clerk (1931–2019), Ghanaian botanist